The 2020 Turkish Super Cup (Turkish: TFF Süper Kupa) was the 47th edition of the Turkish Super Cup since its establishment as Presidential Cup in 1966, the annual Turkish football match contested by the winners of the previous season's top league and cup competitions (or cup runner-up in case the league- and cup-winning club is the same). It was played on 27 January 2021 between the champions of the 2019–20 Süper Lig, İstanbul Başakşehir, and the winners of the 2019–20 Turkish Cup, Trabzonspor. The venue initially selected was Doha, the capital of Qatar. However, the Turkish Football Federation later announced the venue would be changed to the Atatürk Olympic Stadium in Istanbul.

Match

Details

Notes

References

 

2020
Super Cup
İstanbul Başakşehir F.K. matches
Trabzonspor matches
Turkish Super Cup
Sport in Istanbul